Lowland is an unincorporated community in Hamblen County, Tennessee, United States.

History
Lowland has historically been the site of many synthetic fiber plants; the American Enka Company, BASF, and Liberty Fibers once operated on the same plant site in the community.

Geography

Lowland had a post office from February 1, 1949, to June 11, 2011; it still has its own ZIP code, 37778.

The former industrial site of the Liberty Fibers/Enka/BASF plant and its adjacent wastewater treatment plant have since been annexed into the City of Morristown.

Historic sites
The properties of Rural Mount and St. Paul Presbyterian Church in Lowland are both listed on the National Register of Historic Places.

References

Unincorporated communities in Hamblen County, Tennessee
Unincorporated communities in Tennessee